Amos F. Shaw (January 14, 1839 – May 16, 1898) was an American politician in the state of Washington. He served in the Washington House of Representatives from 1889 to 1893, and he was Speaker of the House from 1891 to 1893.

References

Republican Party members of the Washington House of Representatives
1839 births
1898 deaths
19th-century American politicians